John Semper Jr. is an African-American screenwriter, producer and story editor with numerous credits in animation for television. He has worked for miscellaneous companies as Walt Disney Studios, Warner Bros. Animation and Hanna-Barbera Productions during a career which has involved the development of projects for Jim Henson, George Lucas, Stan Lee, Rob Minkoff and others.

Semper created the English-language dialogue for two of Hayao Miyazaki's anime feature films Castle in the Sky and Kiki's Delivery Service, and co-wrote the screenplay for the live-action comedy Class Act.

During the 1990s, Semper was producer/story editor of Spider-Man: The Animated Series. which ran from 1994 to 1998.

In 2016, he began writing a Cyborg series for DC Comics drawn by Brian Stelfreeze.

Creeporia
Semper's most recent creation is the family comedy-horror webseries Creeporia. The character of Creeporia was first introduced in the webseries titled Crypt of Creeporia, a live-action/animated blend of humor and horror. The title role in the original webseries was played by Kommerina DeYoung.

Books
His books include The Singular Affair of the Missing Ball: A Sherlock Whippet Mystery (Lulu Press, 2005), as well as several books based on his scripts for the TLC/PBS Kids preschool series Jay Jay the Jet Plane, and Kids' WB action/adventure series Static Shock.

Awards
"Day of the Chameleon", an episode Semper wrote for Spider-Man: The Animated Series, earned him a 1995 Annie Award nomination for Best Individual Achievement for Writing in the Field of Animation. In 1996, the series was nominated for an NAACP Image Award in the category Outstanding Animated/Live Action/Dramatic Youth or Children's Series/Special. In 2004, Semper was nominated for a Daytime Emmy for his work on Static Shock.

Screenwriting credits
 series head writer denoted in bold

Television
 Shirt Tales (1983)
 The Biskitts (1983)
 The New Scooby and Scrappy-Doo Show (1983-1984)
 Pink Panther and Sons (1984)
 Super Friends: The Legendary Super Powers Show (1984)
 The Smurfs (1984)
 Snorks (1984-1985)
 The Jetsons (1985)
 The 13 Ghosts of Scooby-Doo (1985)
 Kissyfur (1985)
 MoonDreamers (1986)
 Bionic Six (1987)
 DuckTales (1987)
 Fraggle Rock: The Animated Series (1987)
 The Jim Henson Hour (1989)
 Kid 'n Play (1990)
 Spider-Man (1994-1998)
 The Puzzle Place (1995)
 Rugrats (1996-1998)
 Extreme Ghostbusters (1997)
 The Incredible Hulk (1997)
 Clifford the Big Red Dog (2000)
 Jay Jay the Jet Plane (2001)
 Kong: The Animated Series (2001)
 Static Shock (2003-2004): season 3-4 head writer
 Betsy's Kindergarten Adventures (2008)
 Pink Panther and Pals (2010)
 The Adventures of Chuck and Friends (2010-2011)
 Creeporia (2014)
 Justice League Action (2017)

Films
 Class Act (1992)
 Green Lantern: Beware My Power (2022)

Spider-Man website
As of November 2014, to commemorate the 20th anniversary of the Spider-Man: The Animated Series, Semper started cartoonspiderman.com, which includes behind-the-scenes content, a Facebook page, podcasts about the show, and more information about his work related to the 1994 animated series.

References

External links
John Semper official site
John Semper's Crypt of Creeporia
Interview with John Semper on Spider-Man
Marvel Animation Age: John Semper interviews
John Semper Talks Static Shock
 John Semper at ComicBookDB.com

American comics creators
African-American film directors
African-American screenwriters
African-American comics creators
American television producers
American television writers
Place of birth missing (living people)
American film directors
American male screenwriters
Living people
Year of birth missing (living people)
American male television writers
21st-century African-American writers
African-American male writers
African-American television writers
20th-century African-American writers